The 2003 Bahraini Crown Prince Cup was the 3rd edition of the cup tournament in men's football (soccer). This edition featured the top four sides from the Bahraini Premier League 2002-03 season.

Bracket

Bahraini Crown Prince Cup seasons
2003 domestic association football cups
2002–03 in Bahraini football